Iancului is the name of a district in Sector 2 (Bucharest) situated in the northeastern part of Bucharest, the capital of Romania.  is also the name of an intersection in the same district, and has a connection to the Piața Iancului metro station. The name "Iancu" comes from a Romanian revolutionary, Avram Iancu.

Districts of Bucharest